Kirkcaldie & Stains (known as Kirks) was a mid-sized department store in Wellington, New Zealand. It was established in 1863 by John Kirkcaldie and Robert Stains with a capital of £700. The first store was opened on Lambton Quay. In 1868 Kirkcaldie & Stains moved to their final location at the corner of Lambton Quay and Brandon Street, expanding several times. There was a branch in Napier from 1897 until 1917, and a branch on Cuba Street, Wellington for seven years (1871–76).
French luxury skincare brand Sisley was exclusive to the store in New Zealand.

Kirkcaldie & Stains announced on 4 June 2015 that the store would close in January 2016, when the site, after a multi-million dollar refit, would become a David Jones. Shareholders approved the plan on Friday 31 July 2015 in a special meeting. The store closed on Saturday 16 January 2016. 
The main store on Lambton Quay reopened as 'David Jones Wellington' a branch of Australian department store chain David Jones Limited on Thursday 28 July 2016. David Jones closed on Sunday 12 June 2022.

History
The business was founded in 1863 by Scotsman John Kirkcaldie, who had been apprenticed as a draper; and Englishman Robert Stains, who had a retail trade background. The men met in Sydney, Australia, and decided to pool their capital to establish a business in New Zealand. They settled on Wellington as the place, and their first store, 16 feet (4.8 metres) square was the hulk of the wrecked ship Inconstant (ship) known as Plimmer's Noah's Ark, at Lambton Quay. Kirkcaldie & Stains opened for business in 'Waterloo House' on Wednesday 9 December 1863.

In January 1865  Kirkcaldie & Stains held its first annual clearing sale,
and later in 1865  a new two storey store was built in the same location.

In 1868 it moved to new premises on land reclaimed from the harbour, at the corner of Lambton Quay and Brandon Streets. This site is part of the block of land occupied by the business until 2016. The 2 story wooden building was designed by C. J. Toxward. and opened on 24 October 1868, the first building on the block.

A branch store existed on the corner of Ghuznee and Cuba Streets, Wellington from 1871 to 1876. Kirkcaldie & Stains issued their own Bronze Halfpenny token in 1875.

It was discovered in July 1885 that there had been a robbery at Kirkcaldie & Stains. Money and lengths of bulk silk had been stolen by a disgruntled ex-employee, John Cummings. He was sentenced to 3 years in prison.

The partnership was dissolved in 1886 when Robert Stains returned to England. The business remained in the hands of the Kirkcaldie family until the 1930s.

Chronology of events 
 1887 - Fire destroys the city block between Panama Street, Lambton Quay, Featherston Street and Brandon Street in the early hours of Sunday 27 March. The wind blowing from the South East carried sparks across the street to Kirkcaldie & Stains which was saved from destruction by placing wet blankets on the roof.
 1887 - Kirkcaldie & Stains starts holding a semi-annual clearance sale, summer and winter.
 1897 - Kirkcaldie & Stains takes over the Neal & Close Department Store in Napier on the corner of Hastings Street and Emerson Street, opening their first store outside of Wellington.
 1897 - Extensions to the 1868 premises. A new three-story Gothic brick building is built on the Lambton Quay site of the G Reichardt's Pianoforte And Music Warehouse. The building was designed by T Turnbull & Son. The building boasted electric lighting, an Otis hydraulic lift, 3000 feet of Lamson tube (cash carrying apparatus) and the largest tea rooms in the Capital.
 1898 - At about 4.30 pm on Thursday 27 October, two middle-aged women, walk into the Tea Room. Manager Ellen Dick was on duty that day. As she came out of the kitchen, one of the women got up and pulled out a large 6-chamber revolver. She pointed the gun at Mrs Dick and fired. The bullet struck on her left side, just under the rib cage, glanced off and hit the wall. Mrs Dick retreated into the kitchen and hid in the storeroom. After firing twice more, the assailant Annie McWilliam, started back down the stairs. At the front door she was stopped by the store manager, Mr Teasdale and Sidney Kirkcaldie. Ellen Dick was not greatly injured by the shooting as the fabric of her corset slowed the bullet down. Annie McWilliam was remanded in custody at the Terrace Gaol and was later sentenced to seven years prison.
 1899 - July 26, Kirkcaldie & Stains is registered as a private company under the Companies Act 1882.
 1902 - John Kirkcaldie is appointed as managing director.
 1901–1902 - Kirkcaldie & Stains builds a new four-story building in Brandon Street behind the original wooden building on the site of Wellington's first Fire Station. The fire station bell was rung in store for emergencies and for staff closing time until 1952. The bell then was donated in 1954 to the Wellington Fire Board. The building was designed in an Italianate style by W Turnbull, the facade forming the basis of the style for which Kirkcaldies is now famous.
 1904 - A fire in the leased St. George's Hall on Lambton Quay destroyed £500 of stock.
 1905 - Fire destroys the DIC department store block between Panama Street, Lambton Quay and Brandon Street in the early hours of Thursday 26 January. Waves of flames carried across Brandon Street setting fire to the original Kirkcaldie & Stains wooden building, but were put out before taking hold.
 1907 - Kirkcaldie & Stains builds a new 4 story building in Johnston Street on the site of the house of Doctor CD Henry. The building is constructed with new Ferro-concrete and steel. The building was again designed in the Italianate style by W Turnbull.
 1908 - Sidney Kirkcaldie replaces John Kirkcaldie as Managing Director.
 1908-1909 - Kirkcaldie & Stains builds a new 3 story building on the corner of Lambton Quay and Johnston Street on the site of the Occidental Hotel. The building is constructed with Ferro-concrete and steel, features a flat roof for Motor vehicles and is designed in the same Italianate style by W Turnbull.
 1909-1910 - Kirkcaldie & Stains builds a new 3 story building on the corner of Lambton Quay and Brandon Street on the site of the original wooden building. The building is constructed with Ferro-concrete and steel. Four of the 5 buildings that make up the Kirkcaldie & Stains Store are now in the Italianate style designed by W Turnbull. The store occupies a continues street frontage from Johnston street, Lambton Quay to Brandon street.
 1912 - Robert Stains dies in London, aged 77 years.
 1912 - Saul Garshook, a tailor's presser was killed while operating a goods lift without authorization.
 1917 - Branch store in Napier was sold to Blythe's of Napier due to difficult wartime trading. Kirkcaldie and Stains remained a single-location business until 2014.
 1918 – At the Annual General Meeting, John Kirkcaldie makes the announcement of his retirement as director on 31 December 1918. He was in the business for more than 55 years.
 1919 – Charles Francis Smith replaces Sidney Kirkcaldie as Managing Director.
 1924 – A fire breaks out in packing cases on the roof; when it spreads to the store it is put out by the Grinnell sprinkler system; the blaze did not cause any damage.
 1925 - John Kirkcaldie dies, aged 87.
 1927–1928 - Kirkcaldie & Stains remodels the 1897 building in the Italianate style, unifying the facade. By the end of 1928, the simple classical facade is completed.
 1931 - The business was sold by the Kirkcaldie family to British Overseas Stores, an organisation with retail stores around the world. James Crosser replaces Charles Francis Smith as managing director.
 1933 - Charles Morris replaced James Crosser as managing director.
 1938 - A fire breaks out in a packing room and is put out by the sprinkler system, the blaze did not cause any damage.
 1951 - Kirkcaldie & Stains undergoes drastic changes to the interior of the store. Modernising the departments as well as upgrading the stairwells and installing two new Waygood Otis lifts. Alfred Beuth replaces Charles Morris as Managing Director.
 1954 - Queen Elizabeth tours New Zealand in the summer of 1953-4. The capital is decked out with full patriotic splendour. Kirkcaldie & Stains is no exception, displaying a giant crown on the facade that lit up at night.
 1958-1959 - Major improvements are made to the first floor to provide extra space for the fashion department, as ‘off the peg’ garments were becoming increasingly popular.
 1962 - John Barr replaces Alfred Beuth as Managing Director.
 1963 - Sees the 100th year of Kirkcaldie & Stains. The store pulls out all stops for this celebration. Candles light up the top floor windows, while along the verandah a gallery of fairy tale and nursery characters are on display. The shop windows along the street show ‘Our story in Fashion’.
 1973 - Kirkcaldie & Stains celebrates its 110th birthday. The windows along Lambton Quay show a mixture of old and new items, using old motorcycles and corsets next to products sold in the store.
 1983 - During the 120 years celebrations Kirkcaldie & Stains hosts events such as a fashion show and a street parade. The front of the building is decorated with a giant cake, candles and lights along the underside of the verandah.
 1985 - Peter Hansen replaces John Barr as Managing Director.
 1985 - Business bought from British Overseas Stores by Renouf Corporation (later Hellaby Holdings). Significant redevelopment of premises, including construction of two 14 storey business towers at rear of block, completed 1989.
 1986 - After nearly 80 years running throughout the buildings, the Lamson Chute is removed. The brass tubing would form the hand rails on the staircases in the new store.
 1988 - The Christmas Shop opens in Kirkcaldie & Stains.
 1994 - Hellaby Holdings sells business, stock bought primarily by people of Wellington, including staff and customers.
 1993 - Celebrations for 130 years are done in style. A large Birthday cake containing $64,000 in prizes. A parade led with a banner stating ‘Kirkcaldie & Stains - a tradition in Wellington since 1863’, with a ribbon cutting ceremony outside the store with Mayor of Wellington, Fran Wilde, cutting the ribbon.
 1994 - Philip Shewell replaces Peter Hansen as Managing Director.
 2000 - Kirkcaldie & Stains releases a book on the history of the company. 'Kirkcaldie & Stains, A Wellington Story' by Julia Millen. 
 2001 - Richard Holden replaces Philip Shewell as Managing Director.
 2001 - Kirkcaldie & Stains lists on the NZX stock exchange as a public company.
 2001 - The Kirkcaldie & Stains website goes online, June 2001. www.kirkcaldies.co.nz
 2001 - Kirkcaldie & Stains buys the Harbour City Centre, which was originally the D.I.C department store.
 2006 - Mr John Milford replaces Richard Holden as Managing Director. John Milford reorganizes the retail side of the company.
 2008-2015 - Retail side of the company makes a loss.
 2013 - Kirkcaldies celebrates 150 years in retail with a street parade and a display of the history of the store. The store wins the Roy Morgan Department Store Customer Satisfaction Award for two consecutive years. Lunchtime Piano playing stops after 25 years, the Grand piano is donated to the New Zealand School of Dance. The website is revamped and includes online shopping.
 2014 - Interiors branch opened in Thorndon Quay, Wellington. Kirkcaldie & Stains sells the Harbour City Centre. John Milford resigns as Managing Director.
 2015 - Philip Shewell returns as acting Managing Director,  Business announces it will close in January 2016. Interiors branch closes October 2015.
 2016 - Kirkcaldie & Stains closes its doors for the last time on Saturday, 16 January. The Main Store, Lambton Quay lease and the Kirkcaldie & Stains name was purchased by Australian department store chain David Jones Limited and after a complete renovation including the addition of air condition and escalators, reopened as 'David Jones Wellington' on Thursday 28 July 2016 and closed again on 12 June 2022.

Gallery

See also
Smith & Caughey's 
Ballantynes
Arthur Barnett 
H & J Smith 
Farmers
David Jones Limited

References

External links

Companies based in Wellington
Buildings and structures in Wellington City
Department stores of New Zealand
1863 establishments in New Zealand
Retail companies established in 1863
Retail companies disestablished in 2016
2016 disestablishments in New Zealand
Defunct retail companies of New Zealand